There are a number of high schools named Century High School:

 Century High School (Santa Ana, California)
 Century High School (Thousand Oaks, California)
 Century High School (Pocatello, Idaho) 
 Century High School (Ullin, Illinois) 
 Century High School (Sykesville, Maryland) 
 Century High School (Rochester, Minnesota)
 Century High School (Los Lunas, New Mexico)
 Century High School (Bismarck, North Dakota) 
 Century High School (Hillsboro, Oregon)